Nanaia may refer to:
 Nane (goddess), a pagan mother goddess worshipped in Armenia and close to Georgia
 Nanaia Mahuta (born 1970), a New Zealand politician
 Alexandre Nanaia, an actor in the 1999 film The Letter
 Haunuiananaia, a culture hero in Pukerua Bay, a small seaside community at the southern end of the Kapiti Coast, New Zealand